Nenad Šoštarić (born 16 February 1959) is a Croatian retired handball player and current coach of both, RK Lokomotiva Zagreb and the Croatian women's national team.

Career
Šoštarić took over the Croatian women's national team as the head coach on 20 September 2017, following the sacking of Goran Mrđen. He guided them to the sixteenth and last place in the 2018 European Championship. Two years later, Šoštarić led Croatia to a surprising bronze medal at the 2020 European Championship in Denmark.

References

1959 births
Croatian handball coaches
Living people
Croatian male handball players
Handball coaches of international teams
Croatian expatriate sportspeople in China
Croatian expatriate sportspeople in Jordan
Croatian expatriate sportspeople in the United Arab Emirates
Handball players from Zagreb